Cocalinho  is a municipality in the Brazilian state of Mato Grosso.
It has a tropical savanna climate.
As of 2020 the estimated population was 5,681.

Geography

Cocalinho is in the state of Mato Grosso, Brazil.

Climate

The Köppen climate type is Aw : Tropical savanna climate.

Demographics

The population in the 2010 census was 5490.
The estimated population as of 2020 was 5,681.
As of 2010, 90.4% of the population had attended school between the ages of 6 and 14. 
Also as of 2010, the municipal Human Development Index was 0.660.
This compares to 0.328 in 1991 and 0.500 in 2000.

On the 2010 census religion was reported as Catholic by 3,449 people, Evangelical by 1,207 people and Animism by 19 people.

In 2017, the average monthly salary was 2.3 minimum wages. 
Employed people were 17.3% of the  total population. 
Households with monthly income of up to half a minimum wage per person represent 37.1% of the population.
Recent estimates of GDP per capita:

Health and sanitation

1.9% of households have adequate sanitation, 81% of urban households are on public roads with afforestation and 0.3% of urban households are on public roads with adequate urbanization (presence of manhole, sidewalk, pavement and curb).
Annual hospitalizations due to diarrhea are 6.1 per 1,000 inhabitants.
Deaths per 1,000 live births:

Municipal finances
Recent figures for committed municipal expenditure:
Recent figures for realized municipal revenue:

References

Sources

Cocalinho